Nihonium is a synthetic chemical element with the symbol Nh and atomic number 113. It is extremely radioactive; its most stable known isotope, nihonium-286, has a half-life of about 10 seconds. In the periodic table, nihonium is a transactinide element in the p-block. It is a member of period 7 and group 13 (boron group).

Nihonium was first reported to have been created in 2003 by a Russian–American collaboration at the Joint Institute for Nuclear Research (JINR) in Dubna, Russia, and in 2004 by a team of Japanese scientists at Riken in Wakō, Japan. The confirmation of their claims in the ensuing years involved independent teams of scientists working in the United States, Germany, Sweden, and China, as well as the original claimants in Russia and Japan. In 2015, the IUPAC/IUPAP Joint Working Party recognised the element and assigned the priority of the discovery and naming rights for the element to Riken. The Riken team suggested the name nihonium in 2016, which was approved in the same year.

Very little is known about nihonium, as it has only been made in very small amounts that decay within seconds. The anomalously long lives of some superheavy nuclides, including some nihonium isotopes, are explained by the "island of stability" theory. Experiments support the theory, with the half-lives of the confirmed nihonium isotopes increasing from milliseconds to seconds as neutrons are added and the island is approached. Nihonium has been calculated to have similar properties to its homologues boron, aluminium, gallium, indium, and thallium. All but boron are post-transition metals, and nihonium is expected to be a post-transition metal as well. It should also show several major differences from them; for example, nihonium should be more stable in the +1 oxidation state than the +3 state, like thallium, but in the +1 state nihonium should behave more like silver and astatine than thallium. Preliminary experiments in 2017 showed that elemental nihonium is not very volatile; its chemistry remains largely unexplored.

Introduction

History

Early indications 
The syntheses of elements 107 to 112 were conducted at the GSI Helmholtz Centre for Heavy Ion Research in Darmstadt, Germany, from 1981 to 1996. These elements were made by cold fusion reactions, in which targets made of thallium, lead, and bismuth, which are around the stable configuration of 82 protons, are bombarded with heavy ions of period 4 elements. This creates fused nuclei with low excitation energies due to the stability of the targets' nuclei, significantly increasing the yield of superheavy elements. Cold fusion was pioneered by Yuri Oganessian and his team in 1974 at the Joint Institute for Nuclear Research (JINR) in Dubna, Soviet Union. Yields from cold fusion reactions were found to decrease significantly with increasing atomic number; the resulting nuclei were severely neutron-deficient and short-lived. The GSI team attempted to synthesise element 113 via cold fusion in 1998 and 2003, bombarding bismuth-209 with zinc-70; both attempts were unsuccessful.

Faced with this problem, Oganessian and his team at the JINR turned their renewed attention to the older hot fusion technique, in which heavy actinide targets were bombarded with lighter ions. Calcium-48 was suggested as an ideal projectile, because it is very neutron-rich for a light element (combined with the already neutron-rich actinides) and would minimise the neutron deficiencies of the nuclides produced. Being doubly magic, it would confer benefits in stability to the fused nuclei. In collaboration with the team at the Lawrence Livermore National Laboratory (LLNL) in Livermore, California, United States, they made an attempt on element 114 (which was predicted to be a magic number, closing a proton shell, and more stable than element 113).

In 1998, the JINR–LLNL collaboration started their attempt on element 114, bombarding a target of plutonium-244 with ions of calcium-48:

 +  → 292114* → 290114 + 2  + e− → 290113 + νe

A single atom was observed which was thought to be the isotope 289114: the results were published in January 1999. Despite numerous attempts to repeat this reaction, an isotope with these decay properties has never again been found, and the exact identity of this activity is unknown. A 2016 paper by Sigurd Hofmann et al. considered that the most likely explanation of the 1998 result is that two neutrons were emitted by the produced compound nucleus, leading to 290114 and electron capture to 290113, while more neutrons were emitted in all other produced chains. This would have been the first report of a decay chain from an isotope of element 113, but it was not recognised at the time, and the assignment is still uncertain. A similar long-lived activity observed by the JINR team in March 1999 in the 242Pu + 48Ca reaction may be due to the electron-capture daughter of 287114, 287113; this assignment is also tentative.

JINR–LLNL collaboration 
The now-confirmed discovery of element 114 was made in June 1999 when the JINR team repeated the first 244Pu + 48Ca reaction from 1998; following this, the JINR team used the same hot fusion technique to synthesise elements 116 and 118 in 2000 and 2002 respectively via the 248Cm + 48Ca and 249Cf + 48Ca reactions. They then turned their attention to the missing odd-numbered elements, as the odd protons and possibly neutrons would hinder decay by spontaneous fission and result in longer decay chains.

The first report of element 113 was in August 2003, when it was identified as an alpha decay product of element 115. Element 115 had been produced by bombarding a target of americium-243 with calcium-48 projectiles. The JINR–LLNL collaboration published its results in February 2004:

 +  → 291115* → 288115 + 3  → 284113 + 
 +  → 291115* → 287115 + 4  → 283113 + 

Four further alpha decays were observed, ending with the spontaneous fission of isotopes of element 105, dubnium.

Riken 
While the JINR–LLNL collaboration had been studying fusion reactions with 48Ca, a team of Japanese scientists at the Riken Nishina Center for Accelerator-Based Science in Wakō, Japan, led by Kōsuke Morita had been studying cold fusion reactions. Morita had previously studied the synthesis of superheavy elements at the JINR before starting his own team at Riken. In 2001, his team confirmed the GSI's discoveries of elements 108, 110, 111, and 112. They then made a new attempt on element 113, using the same 209Bi + 70Zn reaction that the GSI had attempted unsuccessfully in 1998. Despite the much lower yield expected than for the JINR's hot fusion technique with calcium-48, the Riken team chose to use cold fusion as the synthesised isotopes would alpha decay to known daughter nuclides and make the discovery much more certain, and would not require the use of radioactive targets. In particular, the isotope 278113 expected to be produced in this reaction would decay to the known 266Bh, which had been synthesised in 2000 by a team at the Lawrence Berkeley National Laboratory (LBNL) in Berkeley.

The bombardment of 209Bi with 70Zn at Riken began in September 2003. The team detected a single atom of 278113 in July 2004 and published their results that September:

 +  → 279113* → 278113 + 

The Riken team observed four alpha decays from 278113, creating a decay chain passing through 274Rg, 270Mt, and 266Bh before terminating with the spontaneous fission of 262Db. The decay data they observed for the alpha decay of 266Bh matched the 2000 data, lending support for their claim. Spontaneous fission of its daughter 262Db had not been previously known; the American team had observed only alpha decay from this nuclide.

Road to confirmation 
When the discovery of a new element is claimed, the Joint Working Party (JWP) of the International Union of Pure and Applied Chemistry (IUPAC) and the International Union of Pure and Applied Physics (IUPAP) assembles to examine the claims according to their criteria for the discovery of a new element, and decides scientific priority and naming rights for the elements. According to the JWP criteria, a discovery must demonstrate that the element has an atomic number different from all previously observed values. It should also preferably be repeated by other laboratories, although this requirement has been waived where the data is of very high quality. Such a demonstration must establish properties, either physical or chemical, of the new element and establish that they are those of a previously unknown element. The main techniques used to demonstrate atomic number are cross-reactions (creating claimed nuclides as parents or daughters of other nuclides produced by a different reaction) and anchoring decay chains to known daughter nuclides. For the JWP, priority in confirmation takes precedence over the date of the original claim. Both teams set out to confirm their results by these methods.

2004–2008 
In June 2004 and again in December 2005, the JINR–LLNL collaboration strengthened their claim for the discovery of element 113 by conducting chemical experiments on 268Db, the final decay product of 288115. This was valuable as none of the nuclides in this decay chain were previously known, so that their claim was not supported by any previous experimental data, and chemical experimentation would strengthen the case for their claim, since the chemistry of dubnium is known. 268Db was successfully identified by extracting the final decay products, measuring spontaneous fission (SF) activities and using chemical identification techniques to confirm that they behave like a group 5 element (dubnium is known to be in group 5). Both the half-life and decay mode were confirmed for the proposed 268Db which lends support to the assignment of the parent and daughter nuclei to elements 115 and 113 respectively. Further experiments at the JINR in 2005 confirmed the observed decay data.

In November and December 2004, the Riken team studied the 205Tl + 70Zn reaction, aiming the zinc beam onto a thallium rather than a bismuth target, in an effort to directly produce 274Rg in a cross-bombardment as it is the immediate daughter of 278113. The reaction was unsuccessful, as the thallium target was physically weak compared to the more commonly used lead and bismuth targets, and it deteriorated significantly and became non-uniform in thickness. The reasons for this weakness are unknown, given that thallium has a higher melting point than bismuth. The Riken team then repeated the original 209Bi + 70Zn reaction and produced a second atom of 278113 in April 2005, with a decay chain that again terminated with the spontaneous fission of 262Db. The decay data were slightly different from those of the first chain: this could have been because an alpha particle escaped from the detector without depositing its full energy, or because some of the intermediate decay products were formed in metastable isomeric states.

In 2006, a team at the Heavy Ion Research Facility in Lanzhou, China, investigated the 243Am + 26Mg reaction, producing four atoms of 266Bh. All four chains started with an alpha decay to 262Db; three chains ended there with spontaneous fission, as in the 278113 chains observed at Riken, while the remaining one continued via another alpha decay to 258Lr, as in the 266Bh chains observed at LBNL.

In June 2006, the JINR–LLNL collaboration claimed to have synthesised a new isotope of element 113 directly by bombarding a neptunium-237 target with accelerated calcium-48 nuclei:

 +  → 285113* → 282113 + 3 

Two atoms of 282113 were detected. The aim of this experiment had been to synthesise the isotopes 281113 and 282113 that would fill in the gap between isotopes produced via hot fusion (283113 and 284113) and cold fusion (278113). After five alpha decays, these nuclides would reach known isotopes of lawrencium, assuming that the decay chains were not terminated prematurely by spontaneous fission. The first decay chain ended in fission after four alpha decays, presumably originating from 266Db or its electron-capture daughter 266Rf. Spontaneous fission was not observed in the second chain even after four alpha decays. A fifth alpha decay in each chain could have been missed, since 266Db can theoretically undergo alpha decay, in which case the first decay chain would have ended at the known 262Lr or 262No and the second might have continued to the known long-lived 258Md, which has a half-life of 51.5 days, longer than the duration of the experiment: this would explain the lack of a spontaneous fission event in this chain. In the absence of direct detection of the long-lived alpha decays, these interpretations remain unconfirmed, and there is still no known link between any superheavy nuclides produced by hot fusion and the well-known main body of the chart of nuclides.

2009–2015 
The JWP published its report on elements 113–116 and 118 in 2011. It recognised the JINR–LLNL collaboration as having discovered elements 114 and 116, but did not accept either team's claim to element 113 and did not accept the JINR–LLNL claims to elements 115 and 118. The JINR–LLNL claim to elements 115 and 113 had been founded on chemical identification of their daughter dubnium, but the JWP objected that current theory could not distinguish between superheavy group 4 and group 5 elements by their chemical properties with enough confidence to allow this assignment. The decay properties of all the nuclei in the decay chain of element 115 had not been previously characterised before the JINR experiments, a situation which the JWP generally considers "troublesome, but not necessarily exclusive", and with the small number of atoms produced with neither known daughters nor cross-reactions the JWP considered that their criteria had not been fulfilled. The JWP did not accept the Riken team's claim either due to inconsistencies in the decay data, the small number of atoms of element 113 produced, and the lack of unambiguous anchors to known isotopes.

In early 2009, the Riken team synthesised the decay product 266Bh directly in the 248Cm + 23Na reaction to establish its link with 278113 as a cross-bombardment. They also established the branched decay of 262Db, which sometimes underwent spontaneous fission and sometimes underwent the previously known alpha decay to 258Lr.

In late 2009, the JINR–LLNL collaboration studied the 249Bk + 48Ca reaction in an effort to produce element 117, which would decay to elements 115 and 113 and bolster their claims in a cross-reaction. They were now joined by scientists from Oak Ridge National Laboratory (ORNL) and Vanderbilt University, both in Tennessee, United States, who helped procure the rare and highly radioactive berkelium target necessary to complete the JINR's calcium-48 campaign to synthesise the heaviest elements on the periodic table. Two isotopes of element 117 were synthesised, decaying to element 115 and then element 113:

 +  → 297117* → 294117 + 3  → 290115 + α → 286113 + α
 +  → 297117* → 293117 + 4  → 289115 + α → 285113 + α

The new isotopes 285113 and 286113 produced did not overlap with the previously claimed 282113, 283113, and 284113, so this reaction could not be used as a cross-bombardment to confirm the 2003 or 2006 claims.

In March 2010, the Riken team again attempted to synthesise 274Rg directly through the 205Tl + 70Zn reaction with upgraded equipment; they failed again and abandoned this cross-bombardment route.

After 450 more days of irradiation of bismuth with zinc projectiles, Riken produced and identified another 278113 atom in August 2012. Although electricity prices had soared since the 2011 Tōhoku earthquake and tsunami, and Riken had ordered the shutdown of the accelerator programs to save money, Morita's team was permitted to continue with one experiment, and they chose their attempt to confirm their synthesis of element 113. In this case, a series of six alpha decays was observed, leading to an isotope of mendelevium:

278113 →  +  →  +  →  +  →  +  →  +  →  + 

This decay chain differed from the previous observations at Riken mainly in the decay mode of 262Db, which was previously observed to undergo spontaneous fission, but in this case instead alpha decayed; the alpha decay of 262Db to 258Lr is well-known. The team calculated the probability of accidental coincidence to be 10−28, or totally negligible. The resulting 254Md atom then underwent electron capture to 254Fm, which underwent the seventh alpha decay in the chain to the long-lived 250Cf, which has a half-life of around thirteen years.

The 249Bk + 48Ca experiment was repeated at the JINR in 2012 and 2013 with consistent results, and again at the GSI in 2014. In August 2013, a team of researchers at Lund University in Lund, Sweden, and at the GSI announced that they had repeated the 2003 243Am + 48Ca experiment, confirming the findings of the JINR–LLNL collaboration. The same year, the 2003 experiment had been repeated at the JINR, now also creating the isotope 289115 that could serve as a cross-bombardment for confirming their discovery of the element 117 isotope 293117, as well as its daughter 285113 as part of its decay chain. Confirmation of 288115 and its daughters was published by the team at the LBNL in 2015.

Approval of discoveries 
In December 2015, the conclusions of a new JWP report were published by IUPAC in a press release, in which element 113 was awarded to Riken; elements 115, 117, and 118 were awarded to the collaborations involving the JINR. A joint 2016 announcement by IUPAC and IUPAP had been scheduled to coincide with the publication of the JWP reports, but IUPAC alone decided on an early release because the news of Riken being awarded credit for element 113 had been leaked to Japanese newspapers. For the first time in history, a team of Asian physicists would name a new element. The JINR considered the awarding of element 113 to Riken unexpected, citing their own 2003 production of elements 115 and 113, and pointing to the precedents of elements 103, 104, and 105 where IUPAC had awarded joint credit to the JINR and LBNL. They stated that they respected IUPAC's decision, but reserved determination of their position for the official publication of the JWP reports.

The full JWP reports were published on 21 January 2016. The JWP recognised the discovery of element 113, assigning priority to Riken. They noted that while the individual decay energies of each nuclide in the decay chain of 278113 were inconsistent, their sum was now confirmed to be consistent, strongly suggesting that the initial and final states in 278113 and its daughter 262Db were the same for all three events. The decay of 262Db to 258Lr and 254Md was previously known, firmly anchoring the decay chain of 278113 to known regions of the chart of nuclides. The JWP considered that the JINR–LLNL collaborations of 2004 and 2007, producing element 113 as the daughter of element 115, did not meet the discovery criteria as they had not convincingly determined the atomic numbers of their nuclides through cross-bombardments, which were considered necessary since their decay chains were not anchored to previously known nuclides. They also considered that the previous JWP's concerns over their chemical identification of the dubnium daughter had not been adequately addressed. The JWP recognised the JINR–LLNL–ORNL–Vanderbilt collaboration of 2010 as having discovered elements 117 and 115, and accepted that element 113 had been produced as their daughter, but did not give this work shared credit.

After the publication of the JWP reports, Sergey Dimitriev, the lab director of the Flerov lab at the JINR where the discoveries were made, remarked that he was happy with IUPAC's decision, mentioning the time Riken spent on their experiment and their good relations with Morita, who had learnt the basics of synthesising superheavy elements at the JINR.

The sum argument advanced by the JWP in the approval of the discovery of element 113 was later criticised in a May 2016 study from Lund University and the GSI, as it is only valid if no gamma decay or internal conversion takes place along the decay chain, which is not likely for odd nuclei, and the uncertainty of the alpha decay energies measured in the 278113 decay chain was not small enough to rule out this possibility. If this is the case, similarity in lifetimes of intermediate daughters becomes a meaningless argument, as different isomers of the same nuclide can have different half-lives: for example, the ground state of 180Ta has a half-life of hours, but an excited state 180mTa has never been observed to decay. This study found reason to doubt and criticise the IUPAC approval of the discoveries of elements 115 and 117, but the data from Riken for element 113 was found to be congruent, and the data from the JINR team for elements 115 and 113 to probably be so, thus endorsing the IUPAC approval of the discovery of element 113. Two members of the JINR team published a journal article rebutting these criticisms against the congruence of their data on elements 113, 115, and 117 in June 2017.

Naming 

Using Mendeleev's nomenclature for unnamed and undiscovered elements, nihonium would be known as eka-thallium. In 1979, IUPAC published recommendations according to which the element was to be called ununtrium (with the corresponding symbol of Uut), a systematic element name as a placeholder, until the discovery of the element is confirmed and a name is decided on. The recommendations were widely used in the chemical community on all levels, from chemistry classrooms to advanced textbooks, but were mostly ignored among scientists in the field, who called it "element 113", with the symbol of E113, (113), or even simply 113.

Before the JWP recognition of their priority, the Japanese team had unofficially suggested various names: japonium, after their home country; nishinanium, after Japanese physicist Yoshio Nishina, the "founding father of modern physics research in Japan"; and rikenium, after the institute. After the recognition, the Riken team gathered in February 2016 to decide on a name. Morita expressed his desire for the name to honour the fact that element 113 had been discovered in Japan. Japonium was considered, making the connection to Japan easy to identify for non-Japanese, but it was rejected as Jap is considered an ethnic slur. The discoverers also intended to reference the support of their research by the Japanese people (Riken being almost entirely government-funded), recover lost pride and trust in science among those who were affected by the Fukushima Daiichi nuclear disaster, and honour Japanese chemist Masataka Ogawa's 1908 discovery of rhenium, which he named "nipponium" with symbol Np after the other Japanese pronunciation of Japan's name. As Ogawa's claim had not been accepted, the name "nipponium" could not be reused for a new element, and its symbol Np had since been used for neptunium. In March 2016, Morita proposed the name "nihonium" to IUPAC, with the symbol Nh. The naming realised what had been a national dream in Japanese science ever since Ogawa's claim.

The former president of IUPAP, Cecilia Jarlskog, complained at the Nobel Symposium on Superheavy Elements in Bäckaskog Castle, Sweden, in June 2016 about the lack of openness involved in the process of approving new elements, and stated that she believed that the JWP's work was flawed and should be redone by a new JWP. A survey of physicists determined that many felt that the Lund–GSI 2016 criticisms of the JWP report were well-founded, but that the conclusions would hold up if the work was redone, and the new president, Bruce McKellar, ruled that the proposed names should be released in a joint IUPAP–IUPAC press release. Thus, IUPAC and IUPAP publicised the proposal of nihonium that June, and set a five-month term to collect comments, after which the name would be formally established at a conference. The name was officially approved in November 2016. The naming ceremony for the new element was held in Tokyo, Japan, in March 2017, with Naruhito, then the Crown Prince of Japan, in attendance.

Isotopes 

Nihonium has no stable or naturally occurring isotopes. Several radioactive isotopes have been synthesised in the laboratory, either by fusing two atoms or by observing the decay of heavier elements. Eight different isotopes of nihonium have been reported with atomic masses 278, 282–287, and 290 (287Nh and 290Nh are unconfirmed); they all decay through alpha decay to isotopes of roentgenium. There have been indications that nihonium-284 can also decay by electron capture to copernicium-284, though estimates of the partial half-life for this branch vary strongly by model. A spontaneous fission branch of nihonium-285 has also been reported.

Stability and half-lives 

The stability of nuclei quickly decreases with the increase in atomic number after curium, element 96, whose half-life is over ten thousand times longer than that of any subsequent element. All isotopes with an atomic number above 101 undergo radioactive decay with half-lives of less than 30 hours: this is because of the ever-increasing Coulomb repulsion of protons, so that the strong nuclear force cannot hold the nucleus together against spontaneous fission for long. Calculations suggest that in the absence of other stabilising factors, elements with more than 103 protons should not exist. Researchers in the 1960s suggested that the closed nuclear shells around 114 protons and 184 neutrons should counteract this instability, and create an "island of stability" containing nuclides with half-lives reaching thousands or millions of years. The existence of the island is still unproven, but the existence of the superheavy elements (including nihonium) confirms that the stabilising effect is real, and in general the known superheavy nuclides become longer-lived as they approach the predicted location of the island.

All nihonium isotopes are unstable and radioactive; the heavier nihonium isotopes are more stable than the lighter ones, as they are closer to the centre of the island. The most stable known nihonium isotope, 286Nh, is also the heaviest; it has a half-life of 8 seconds. The isotope 285Nh, as well as the unconfirmed 287Nh and 290Nh, have also been reported to have half-lives of over a second. The isotopes 284Nh and 283Nh have half-lives of 0.90 and 0.12 seconds respectively. The remaining two isotopes have half-lives between 0.1 and 100 milliseconds: 282Nh has a half-life of 61 milliseconds, and 278Nh, the lightest known nihonium isotope, is also the shortest-lived, with a half-life of 1.4 milliseconds. This rapid increase in the half-lives near the closed neutron shell at N = 184 is seen in roentgenium, copernicium, and nihonium (elements 111 through 113), where each extra neutron so far multiplies the half-life by a factor of 5 to 20.

Predicted properties 
Very few properties of nihonium or its compounds have been measured; this is due to its extremely limited and expensive production and the fact it decays very quickly. Properties of nihonium mostly remain unknown and only predictions are available.

Physical and atomic 

Nihonium is the first member of the 7p series of elements and the heaviest group 13 element on the periodic table, below boron, aluminium, gallium, indium, and thallium. All the group 13 elements except boron are metals, and nihonium is expected to follow suit. Nihonium is predicted to show many differences from its lighter homologues. The major reason for this is the spin–orbit (SO) interaction, which is especially strong for the superheavy elements, because their electrons move much faster than in lighter atoms, at velocities close to the speed of light. In relation to nihonium atoms, it lowers the 7s and the 7p electron energy levels (stabilising those electrons), but two of the 7p electron energy levels are stabilised more than the other four. The stabilisation of the 7s electrons is called the inert pair effect, and the separation of the 7p subshell into the more and less stabilised parts is called subshell splitting. Computational chemists see the split as a change of the second, azimuthal quantum number l, from 1 to 1/2 and 3/2 for the more and less stabilised parts of the 7p subshell, respectively. For theoretical purposes, the valence electron configuration may be represented to reflect the 7p subshell split as 7s2 7p1/21. The first ionisation energy of nihonium is expected to be 7.306 eV, the highest among the metals of group 13. Similar subshell splitting should exist for the 6d electron levels, with four being 6d3/2 and six being 6d5/2. Both these levels are raised to be close in energy to the 7s ones, high enough to possibly be chemically active. This would allow for the possibility of exotic nihonium compounds without lighter group 13 analogues.

Periodic trends would predict nihonium to have an atomic radius larger than that of thallium due to it being one period further down the periodic table, but calculations suggest nihonium has an atomic radius of about 170 pm, the same as that of thallium, due to the relativistic stabilisation and contraction of its 7s and 7p1/2 orbitals. Thus, nihonium is expected to be much denser than thallium, with a predicted density of about 16 to 18 g/cm3 compared to thallium's 11.85 g/cm3, since nihonium atoms are heavier than thallium atoms but have the same volume. Bulk nihonium is expected to have a hexagonal close-packed crystal structure, like thallium. The melting and boiling points of nihonium have been predicted to be 430 °C and 1100 °C respectively, exceeding the values for indium and thallium, following periodic trends. Nihonium should have a bulk modulus of 20.8 GPa, about half that of thallium (43 GPa).

Chemical 
The chemistry of nihonium is expected to be very different from that of thallium. This difference stems from the spin–orbit splitting of the 7p shell, which results in nihonium being between two relatively inert closed-shell elements (copernicium and flerovium), an unprecedented situation in the periodic table. Nihonium is expected to be less reactive than thallium, because of the greater stabilisation and resultant chemical inactivity of the 7s subshell in nihonium compared to the 6s subshell in thallium. The standard electrode potential for the Nh+/Nh couple is predicted to be 0.6 V. Nihonium should be a rather noble metal.

The metallic group 13 elements are typically found in two oxidation states: +1 and +3. The former results from the involvement of only the single p electron in bonding, and the latter results in the involvement of all three valence electrons, two in the s-subshell and one in the p-subshell. Going down the group, bond energies decrease and the +3 state becomes less stable, as the energy released in forming two additional bonds and attaining the +3 state is not always enough to outweigh the energy needed to involve the s-electrons. Hence, for aluminium and gallium +3 is the most stable state, but +1 gains importance for indium and by thallium it becomes more stable than the +3 state. Nihonium is expected to continue this trend and have +1 as its most stable oxidation state.

The simplest possible nihonium compound is the monohydride, NhH. The bonding is provided by the 7p1/2 electron of nihonium and the 1s electron of hydrogen. The SO interaction causes the binding energy of nihonium monohydride to be reduced by about 1 eV and the nihonium–hydrogen bond length to decrease as the bonding 7p1/2 orbital is relativistically contracted. This is unique among the 7p element monohydrides; all the others have relativistic expansion of the bond length instead of contraction. Another effect of the SO interaction is that the Nh–H bond is expected to have significant pi bonding character (side-on orbital overlap), unlike the almost pure sigma bonding (head-on orbital overlap) in thallium monohydride (TlH). The analogous monofluoride (NhF) should also exist. Nihonium(I) is predicted to be more similar to silver(I) than thallium(I): the Nh+ ion is expected to more willingly bind anions, so that NhCl should be quite soluble in excess hydrochloric acid or ammonia; TlCl is not. In contrast to Tl+, which forms the strongly basic hydroxide (TlOH) in solution, the Nh+ cation should instead hydrolyse all the way to the amphoteric oxide Nh2O, which would be soluble in aqueous ammonia and weakly soluble in water.

The adsorption behaviour of nihonium on gold surfaces in thermochromatographical experiments is expected to be closer to that of astatine than that of thallium. The destabilisation of the 7p3/2 subshell effectively leads to a valence shell closing at the 7s2 7p2 configuration rather than the expected 7s2 7p6 configuration with its stable octet. As such, nihonium, like astatine, can be considered to be one p-electron short of a closed valence shell. Hence, even though nihonium is in group 13, it has several properties similar to the group 17 elements. (Tennessine in group 17 has some group-13-like properties, as it has three valence electrons outside the 7s2 7p2 closed shell.) Nihonium is expected to be able to gain an electron to attain this closed-shell configuration, forming the −1 oxidation state like the halogens (fluorine, chlorine, bromine, iodine, and astatine). This state should be more stable than it is for thallium as the SO splitting of the 7p subshell is greater than that for the 6p subshell. Nihonium should be the most electronegative of the metallic group 13 elements, even more electronegative than tennessine, the period 7 congener of the halogens: in the compound NhTs, the negative charge is expected to be on the nihonium atom rather than the tennessine atom. The −1 oxidation should be more stable for nihonium than for tennessine. The electron affinity of nihonium is calculated to be around 0.68 eV, higher than thallium's at 0.4 eV; tennessine's is expected to be 1.8 eV, the lowest in its group. It is theoretically predicted that nihonium should have an enthalpy of sublimation around 150 kJ/mol and an enthalpy of adsorption on a gold surface around −159 kJ/mol.

Significant 6d involvement is expected in the Nh–Au bond, although it is expected to be more unstable than the Tl–Au bond and entirely due to magnetic interactions. This raises the possibility of some transition metal character for nihonium. On the basis of the small energy gap between the 6d and 7s electrons, the higher oxidation states +3 and +5 have been suggested for nihonium. Some simple compounds with nihonium in the +3 oxidation state would be the trihydride (NhH3), trifluoride (NhF3), and trichloride (NhCl3). These molecules are predicted to be T-shaped and not trigonal planar as their boron analogues are: this is due to the influence of the 6d5/2 electrons on the bonding. The heavier nihonium tribromide (NhBr3) and triiodide (NhI3) are trigonal planar due to the increased steric repulsion between the peripheral atoms; accordingly, they do not show significant 6d involvement in their bonding, though the large 7s–7p energy gap means that they show reduced sp2 hybridisation compared to their boron analogues.

The bonding in the lighter NhX3 molecules can be considered as that of a linear  species (similar to HgF2 or ) with an additional Nh–X bond involving the 7p orbital of nihonium perpendicular to the other two ligands. These compounds are all expected to be highly unstable towards the loss of an X2 molecule and reduction to nihonium(I):
NhX3 → NhX + X2
Nihonium thus continues the trend down group 13 of reduced stability of the +3 oxidation state, as all five of these compounds have lower reaction energies than the unknown thallium(III) iodide.

The +5 oxidation state is unknown for all lighter group 13 elements: calculations predict that nihonium pentahydride (NhH5) and pentafluoride (NhF5) should have a square pyramidal molecular geometry, but also that both would be highly thermodynamically unstable to loss of an X2 molecule and reduction to nihonium(III). The structures of the nihonium trifluoride and pentafluoride molecules are the same as those for chlorine trifluoride and pentafluoride.

Experimental chemistry 
The chemical characteristics of nihonium have yet to be determined unambiguously. The isotopes 284Nh, 285Nh, and 286Nh have half-lives long enough for chemical investigation. From 2010 to 2012, some preliminary chemical experiments were performed at the JINR to determine the volatility of nihonium. The isotope 284Nh was investigated, made as the daughter of 288Mc produced in the 243Am+48Ca reaction. The nihonium atoms were synthesised in a recoil chamber and then carried along polytetrafluoroethylene (PTFE) capillaries at 70 °C by a carrier gas to the gold-covered detectors. About ten to twenty atoms of 284Nh were produced, but none of these atoms were registered by the detectors, suggesting either that nihonium was similar in volatility to the noble gases (and thus diffused away too quickly to be detected) or, more plausibly, that pure nihonium was not very volatile and thus could not efficiently pass through the PTFE capillaries. Formation of the hydroxide NhOH should ease the transport, as nihonium hydroxide is expected to be more volatile than elemental nihonium, and this reaction could be facilitated by adding more water vapour into the carrier gas. It seems likely that this formation is not kinetically favoured, so the longer-lived isotopes 285Nh and 286Nh were considered more desirable for future experiments.

A 2017 experiment at the JINR, producing 284Nh and 285Nh via the 243Am+48Ca reaction as the daughters of 288Mc and 289Mc, avoided this problem by removing the quartz surface, using only PTFE. No nihonium atoms were observed after chemical separation, implying an unexpectedly large retention of nihonium atoms on PTFE surfaces. This experimental result for the interaction limit of nihonium atoms with a PTFE surface  disagrees significantly with previous theory, which expected a lower value of 14.00 kJ/mol. This suggests that the nihonium species involved in the previous experiment was likely not elemental nihonium but rather nihonium hydroxide, and that high-temperature techniques such as vacuum chromatography would be necessary to further probe the behaviour of elemental nihonium. Bromine saturated with boron tribromide has been suggested as a carrier gas for experiments on nihonium chemistry; this oxidises nihonium's lighter congener thallium to thallium(III), providing an avenue to investigate the oxidation states of nihonium, similar to earlier experiments done on the bromides of group 5 elements, including the superheavy dubnium.

See also

Notes

References

Bibliography

External links 

 Nihonium at The Periodic Table of Videos (University of Nottingham)
 Uut and Uup Add Their Atomic Mass to Periodic Table
 Discovery of Elements 113 and 115
 Superheavy elements
 WebElements.com: Nihonium

 
Chemical elements
Synthetic elements